The North Ninth Street Historic District is a national historic district located at Downtown Columbia, Missouri, USA. It encompasses seven contributing buildings in an area that has historically been a center of commerce, recreation and culture.  They were built between about 1885 and 1954, and are the L.J. Slate Billiard Hall (c. 1913), Allen Arnold Building (c. 1894), A. Victor Building (c. 1894), Lafayette Hume Building (c. 1885), Varsity Theatre (1927), Crosswhite Bakery (c. 1918), and Hume Building (c. 1904). The popular music venue The Blue Note is located within the district.

It was listed on the National Register of Historic Places in 2004.

Gallery

References

Historic districts on the National Register of Historic Places in Missouri
Victorian architecture in Missouri
Geography of Columbia, Missouri
Buildings and structures in Columbia, Missouri
National Register of Historic Places in Boone County, Missouri